Caboche is a French surname, which means "head" or "cabbage". Notable people with the surname include:

 Michel Caboche (1946–2021), French plant physiologist
 Simon Caboche (fl. early 15th cent.), French rebel

See also
 Cabossed, term from heraldry

French-language surnames